The Cuba women's national baseball team is a national team of Cuba and is controlled by the Baseball Federation of Cuba. It represents the nation in women's international competition. The team is a member of the Pan American Baseball Confederation.

Rosters

2015 Pan American Games 
The Cuba women's national baseball team roster for the 2015 Pan American Games (as of 19 July 2015): 

 Leydis Arzuaga (C)
 Yurismary Baez (OF)
 Yulisa Barban (OF)
 Dayanna Batista (IF)
 Vania Cabrera (IF)
 Ana Castellanos (P)
 Yoidania Castro (P)
 Enelsy Cordovi (P)
 Yanet Cruz (P)
 Libia Duarte (IF)
 Jessica Herrera (IF)
 Yadira Lopez (P)
 Dianelis Munoz (OF)
 Odrisleisis Peguero (OF)
 Nilsa Rodriguez (IF)
 Yordanka Rodriguez (C)
 Mayumis Solano (P)
 Mariandy Torres (OF)

Legend: C = Catcher, IF = Infielder, OF = Outfielder, P = Pitcher

References

Women's national baseball teams
W